Deep Thoughts from a Shallow Mind is the second studio album by American country music artist Doug Supernaw. It was released on September 13, 1994 and it produced the singles "What'll You Do About Me", "You Never Even Called Me by My Name" (a cover of the David Allan Coe song), and "State Fair". "What'll You Do About Me" was previously a #76 single in 1984 for Steve Earle, and a #74 single in 1992 for The Forester Sisters.

Alanna Nash of Entertainment Weekly gave the album a C+ rating, saying that it lacked the sense of humor of Supernaw's debut.

Track listing

Personnel
Listed in liner notes.
 David Allan Coe − vocals on "You Never Even Called Me by My Name"
 Eddie Bayers − drums
 Michael Black − background vocals
 Larry Byrom − acoustic guitar
 Glen Duncan − fiddle
 Paul Franklin – steel guitar
 Merle Haggard − vocals on "You Never Even Called Me by My Name"
 David Hungate − bass guitar
 Waylon Jennings − vocals on "You Never Even Called Me by My Name"
 Carl Marsh – keyboards
 Steve Nathan – organ, synthesizer
 Charley Pride – vocals on "You Never Even Called Me by My Name"
 Matt Rollings – piano
 Doug Supernaw – lead vocals, background vocals
 Billy Joe Walker, Jr. – acoustic guitar, electric guitar
 Dennis Wilson – background vocals
 Curtis "Mr. Harmony" Young – background vocals

Chart performance

Album

Singles

References

1994 albums
BNA Records albums
Doug Supernaw albums
Albums produced by Richard Landis